The Screen Award for Best Cinematography is a technical award of The Screen Awards, (previously named Star Screen Awards), an annual awards ceremony held in India honouring professional excellence in the Bollywood Film Industry. The nomination and award selection is done by a panel of distinguished professionals from the industry.

The winners are listed below:-

References

 Cinematography
Awards for best cinematography